Aglandjia ( []) is a suburb and a municipality of Nicosia, Cyprus. The municipality has a population of 20,783 (2011) and is contiguous with Nicosia Municipality.

Aglandjia is located near the buffer zone. It has an area of about 31 km2, of which 14 km2 is agricultural land occupied by the Turkish army since 1974; of the remaining 17 km2, 9 km2 are national forest parks (Athalassa park, 8.6 km2 and Pedagogical Academy park 0.4 km2).

Name

Another theory states that the name derives from the surname of the Frankish family de Aglande, who owned the area during the Frankish rule in Middle Ages.

Geography
Aglandjia is Nicosia's most elevated suburb, being predominantly sited upon hills and tableland. It was initially constructed in medieval times prior to Ottoman rule; although it was an important site for defensive purposes, it also offered natural resources and a healthy climate.

Aglandjia contains many green spaces, the largest being the "big lung" of Nicosia, Athalassa Forest; the municipality additionally contains Ayios Yeorgios Park, Aglandjia Municipal Park, and 45 smaller parks, as well as other natural areas.

Aglandjia is built along the road that led from Nicosia to Larnaca before the invasion. Two trapezoidal hills overlook the road on both sides. The hill on the north is Arona hill, which is now under Turkish occupation. The hill on the south is called Aronas of Athalassa or Mount Lion or Liontarovounos.

Demography

Aglandjia has a population of 22,000 inhabitants, of whom 7,500 are refugees. It maintains a nucleus with traditional brick houses with yards and narrow streets, surrounded by more recently constructed houses, blocks of flats, and refugee housing.

Administration

Aglandjia was declared a Municipality by a referendum in May 1986. The Municipal Council is made up of the mayor and sixteen Municipal Councilors. The current mayor is Andreas Konstantinou. Aglandjia Municipality employs 24 permanent employees and 30 workers (permanent and casual) who staff the services below, which have their seat in the Town Hall:
 Secretariat 
 Technical services 
 Financial services 
 Greenery and Environment services 
 Hygiene services 
 Cultural services

History

The history of Aglandjia goes back as far as 3888 BC. Several tombs dating to the Bronze Age have been found on Arona hill (Mount Lion or Liontarovounos). The hill is strategically located for the defense of the area, so the settlement there was most likely a military deployment during the first phase of its history.

Around the hill there was an ancient settlement, from which the city of Ledra may have originated. Important archaeological works of art and inscriptions in the Cypriot syllabary have been found in Kafizin or Small Aronas, a historic site with a cave dedicated to the worship of a Nymph. These objects indicate the site was in use as a place of worship during the Hellenistic period, specifically between 225 and 218 BC, during the reigns of Ptolemy the Benefactor and Ptolemy Philopatoras.

A variety of unique, locally manufactured pottery was also found at the site, including various bowls, two-handled vessels, cup-bearers, feeding bottles, mud-lighters, jars, cooking utensils, frying pans, wash basins, jugs, combined pots, urns, amphorae, rhytons, large jars and jar lids, and objects testifying to the practice of weaving.

In the Middle Ages, the Lefkomiatis settlement was in the area of Aglandjia. The area seems to have been inhabited towards the end of Frankish rule, during the reign of Jacques II (1468–1473). The medieval La Cava castle, built on Arona hill around 1385 by King Jacques I, was used as an observatory for the control of the road leading from Larnaca to Nicosia.The castle took its name from the large rock cistern which still survives today. 
The castle was blasted by the Venetians during the third decade of the 16th century, while the Ottomans used the bigger of its two towers as a powder magazine. Up until 1870 a considerable amount of the Castle was still standing, including the vaulted hall, the curtain walls, and two towers. However, the majority of the Castle was pulled down in that year to build the Church of Phaneromeni. In 1888 the area was excavated by a Mr M R James. The Castle was proclaimed an ancient moment in 1915. Today a portion of the Great Tower and Second Tower exists together with the cistern.

After the conquest of Cyprus by the Ottomans, the Aglandjia settlement declined. It started to form a self-sufficient rural settlement around the end of the 18th century whose inhabitants engaged in farming, stockbreeding, and quarrying. Around the end of the 18th century, dragoman Hadjigeorgakis Kornesios erected Ayios Yeoryios church on the site of the cemetery and Ayios Yeoryios church in Athalassa.

Aglandjia contributed organized groups to the EOKA struggle, and local volunteers also participated in the events of 1964. During the Turkish invasion of 1974, Aglandjia was bombed. The Turkish army continues to occupy 45% of the municipality's territory.

International relations

Twin towns – Sister cities
Aglandjia is twinned with:
  Azov, Russia
  Kalamata, Greece.
  Zografou, Greece

References

External links
 Aglandjia Municipality
 Old website
 Gazetteer Entry

Municipalities in Nicosia District
Suburbs of Nicosia